Strategy & Tactics (S&T) is a wargaming magazine now published by Decision Games, notable for publishing a complete new wargame in each issue.

Beginnings
Strategy & Tactics was first published in January 1967 under its original editor, Chris Wagner, intended as a better alternative to Avalon Hill's magazine, The General. Strategy & Tactics began life as a wargaming fanzine published by Wagner (then a staff sergeant with the US Air Force in Japan), at first in Japan, then moving to the United States with Wagner.

Graphic designer Redmond Simonsen was hired soon after to improve the quality of the magazine. When subscriptions became stagnant, debts began to accumulate. Jim Dunnigan created the company Simulations Publications to save Strategy & Tactics; Dunnigan had been contributing to the magazine since issue #2 (February 1967), and when Wagner was having financial difficulties he sold the rights to the magazine to Dunnigan for $1. A persistent rumor that Dunnigan had purchased S&T from Wagner for one dollar, and that furthermore the dollar was not paid until much later, was confirmed by Wagner during an interview printed in S&T issue #83 (The Kaiser's Battle).

Dunnigan era
Dunnigan set up his new company SPI in the windowless basement of a building in New York City's Lower East Side, where he published his first issue, Strategy & Tactics #18 (September 1969); starting with that issue, every issue included a new wargame. Albert Nofi became an associate editor on the magazine in 1969. The first game published in issue #18 was Crete.  Not only did this represent a break from the cautious policy of Avalon Hill (a pioneer company in modern commercial wargaming, and the leading company in the fledgling wargaming industry) in publishing only one or two games per year (for fear of new games cannibalizing sales of old ones), but the need for new game designs spurred research into many of the lesser-known corners of military history.  Despite the diversity in themes, the style of the games was fairly consistent.  They predominantly used a hexgrid for the maps and many rule concepts such as zones of control were repeated in many games.

In addition to the games, the magazine featured many articles on military history, many of them notable for applying modern quantitative analysis to battles that had traditionally been described in a narrative "heroic" style.

Avalon Hill continued to produce more than just wargames, priding itself on other themes, such as party games, sports titles, and children's games.  Dunnigan's focus remained primarily on military history, and he felt that there was a market for detailed historical articles as an accompaniment to detailed and accurate games. (A single experiment in using the S&T game format to explore the use of strategy and tactics in professional sports, Scrimmage, in issue #37, was not repeated.) S&T now embarked on providing six new games a year, and at a much lower cost per game than was to be found elsewhere, with the magazine itself almost being a bonus.  There was no middleman in the form of a local games store; subscribers got their games delivered right to their homes. Circulation of the magazine was substantial and games that might not otherwise sell went to subscribers automatically, eclipsing expected independent sales of most titles. SPI also benefited from having the magazine as an advertising vehicle for boxed (i.e. non-magazine) games, sold directly or through local games stores.

In 1972, Strategy & Tactics spun off Moves magazine, which was focused more on how to play the games.

S&T's circulation exceeded that of Avalon Hill's The General by the mid-1970s, improving its physical appearance dramatically under the guidance of Redmond Simonsen. (SPI's non-magazine games were improving by leaps and bounds also – their first games were made in black and white on regular paper; counters were simple colored paper that had to be cut out and glued to cardboard by the purchaser.  Rules were not done in booklet form, but on large sheets of paper folded to letter-size as a cost-savings measure.  There were no costs incurred, then, for cutting, collating or binding – nor for boxes or counter trays.)  As die-cut counters, printed on both sides in full color, became the norm, they were included in the magazine games, as were two color and finally full color maps.

S&T eventually made its magazine games available for purchase in stores with standard boxes, dice and counter trays, and also sold boxes and counter trays separately for the convenience of subscribers who wanted to store their subscriber game components in something other than the envelope the magazine had been delivered in.

By the mid-1970s, SPI's annual income rose to the six-figure range, with paid staff numbering as many as 40 people, and with 40+ games being produced through both the magazine and boxed sales annually.  Competition began to spring up, with many new companies appearing in the mid- to late-1970s.  Wargaming was reaching its high-water mark, just as the release of Squad Leader by Avalon Hill took the wargaming world by storm (eventually resulting in an unprecedented 200,000 copies sold).  Such faith was placed in the future of the industry that a Game Designer's Guild was even created, in the hope that it just might be possible to earn a comfortable living providing wargames to the public.

Dunnigan's departure
However, despite annual income declared at two million dollars, SPI's sales declined, and while monetary income remained constant, increasing inflation eroded the company's profits.  Dunnigan's departure in the late 1970s led to internal struggle at SPI in 1980; chief among SPI's problems was poor marketing.  Howie Barasch's departure as marketing manager in the late 1970s was never properly rectified and the founder of S&T, Chris Wagner, who was now a management consultant, was brought back into the fold to address SPI's marketing problems.  He found that many sales representatives, previously independently commissioned by SPI, had no idea they were still representing the company, and some didn't even realize the company was still in operation, as no one had been in touch with them for several years.

In 1980 Strategy & Tactics spun off Ares magazine, which focused more on science-fiction and fantasy, and featured a game in every issue.

TSR
Financial mismanagement also cost SPI money, and a recession didn't help matters.  Negotiations began with Avalon Hill and then TSR, Inc. for a buy-out.

By the time of the buyout in 1982, SPI was selling an estimated 60-70% of all wargames in the world.  Avalon Hill remained a bigger company, but only because it sold many more sports and general interest games than wargames.  By this point, S&T boasted 30,000 subscribers and the magazine was truly the flagship of SPI.

The popularity of S&T reached the point where SPI began publishing a second magazine, Moves, that consisted primarily of articles on winning strategies for playing SPI games and additional scenarios for them.   A third magazine, Ares, devoted to science-fiction and fantasy games and including one in each issue, was also published for a time.

One innovation of S&T was its feedback system, in which readers could answer various multiple-choice questions on a return card, whose data would then be entered into a Burroughs minicomputer for analysis.  Thus S&T always had good information about which games readers were looking for.

When TSR purchased SPI in 1982, the company did not honor lifetime subscriptions to Strategy & Tactics. SPI unfortunately had no assets to its name when the takeover occurred, but there were over 1,000 subscribers who had made a significant payment (in c. 1978 terms) for a "lifetime subscription" to S&T, meaning that they were entitled to all future issues without any further payment.  These subscribers were informed that their subscriptions would not be honored. People who had placed pre-release, paid, orders for certain games that had been in development were informed that they would receive neither the game they had paid for nor a refund of the money they had paid for it. TSR saved money in the short term, but alienated its best customers.

SPI's design staff moved on to Avalon Hill, where they set up a subsidiary company based in New York called Victory Games.  It produced many unique and popular titles, which by the late 1980s were outselling even Avalon Hill games.  TSR continued making games, hoping to recoup its investment in SPI (another reason was the enthusiasm of some staff members for wargaming), but despite a healthier distribution chain than SPI had enjoyed, its wargame line was never successful.  S&T Magazine was eventually sold to 3W, a small company which published The Wargamer magazine, a direct competitor.  By this time, other companies were also stepping up production, and a splintered market ensured that the days of selling 50,000 copies or more of a title were gone.  Publishers became happy to sell 10,000 copies, with 20,000 being considered phenomenal.

TSR produced the magazine from issue #91 (Winter 1983) to #111 (1987) and then sold the rights for Strategy & Tactics to 3W.

3W and Decision Games

3W published the magazine from #112 (June 1987) to #139. It was during this decline that 3W continued its publication of S&T, and James Dunnigan returned for a brief stint as editor of the magazine (Keith Poulter was the editor from issues #112 to #119, Ty Bomba from #120 to #129, James Dunnigan from #130 to #139).  Although circulation began to increase again, subscriptions never recovered fully, and most sales were through game stores and not subscriptions, which meant third party retailers cut into profits.  Sales were also no longer guaranteed.

3W's Keith Poulter later left the business, and in 1991 Strategy & Tactics was sold to Decision Games, which has been publishing the magazine since issue #140 (February 1991). Since issue #176 (September/October 1995), Decision Games has also offered a newsstand version at a lower price without the wargame that comes in every regular issue. According to the official website "by issue #216, more copies of the magazine edition were being produced than the game edition."  In 2003, Decision Games spun off Strategy & Tactics Press as a sister company for magazine and media development. In 2008, World at War magazine was begun which covers World War II. In 2012, Modern War magazine began which covers post-World War II military history. Strategy & Tactics continues to cover all periods in history and so the periods covered may overlap.

As S&T reached its 40th year as a professionally produced magazine, it laid claim to being the longest continually published wargame magazine.

Awards and value

Strategy & Tactics won thirteen Charles S. Roberts/Origins Awards between 1974 and 2009, and in 1997 the magazine was inducted into the  Adventure Gaming Hall of Fame.

Back issues of Strategy & Tactics are highly valued by wargame collectors, and some have become quite expensive. S&T magazine games that have not been played and have counter sheets intact ("unpunched") are worth much more than played ("punched") games.

See also
 For Your Eyes Only (magazine)

References

External links
 Strategy & Tactics homepage
 Index of Articles and Games in Strategy & Tactics Issues #1 to #90
 Checklist of Strategy & Tactics issues
Review in the Chicago Tribune

Magazines established in 1967
Magazines published in California
Magazines published in New York City
Monthly magazines published in the United States
Origins Award winners
Simulations Publications games
Wargaming magazines